R Lyrae is a 4th magnitude semiregular variable star in the constellation Lyra, approximately 350 light years away from Earth. It is a red giant star of the spectral type M5III, meaning it has a surface temperature of under 3,500 kelvins. It is much larger and brighter, yet cooler, than the Sun. In the near-infrared J band, it is brighter than the nearby Vega.

R Lyrae is unusual in that it is a red star with a high proper motion, greater than 50 milliarcseconds a year.

The variability is not consistent and regular, but periods of 46, 64, 378, and 1,000 days have been reported, with the 46-day period being the strongest.

It is calculated that R Lyrae was a  star on the main sequence.  It is considered an oxygen-rich asymptotic giant branch star, with both hydrogen and helium shells fusing.

References

Lyra (constellation)
Lyrae, 13
Lyrae, R
Semiregular variable stars
7157
175865
092862
Durchmusterung objects
M-type giants